The Silver Wolf (Norwegian: Sølvulven) is the highest award made by the Norwegian Guide and Scout Association "for services of the most exceptional character."  The award consists of a Silver Wolf suspended from a blue and green neck ribbon. Recipients may wear the corresponding square knot, with a green strand over a blue strand, on their uniform.

The Norwegian Silver Wolf was first awarded by the Norwegian Boy Scout Association in 1915. When the Boy Scout Association and Girl Guide Association merged in 1978, the Silver Wolf Award was discontinued, but in 1998 the merged Norwegian Guide and Scout Association restarted awarding the Silver Wolf.

Recipients 
Notable recipients include Ragnvald Iversen, Kaare Amdam, Christian Dons, Hans Møller Gasmann, Robert Baden-Powell, Hubert S. Martin, Birger L. D. Brekke, Odd Hopp, J. S. Wilson, Stein Løvold and Gisle Johnson.

See also
 Bronze Wolf of World Scout Committee
 Silver Wolf of The Scout Association
 Silver Wolf of Scouterna
 Silver Buffalo Award of the Boy Scouts of America
 Silver Fish

References

Scout and Guide awards
Scouting and Guiding in Norway
Norwegian awards